Get Hurt may refer to:

 Get Hurt (album), by the Gaslight Anthem (2014)
 Get Hurt (EP), by No Age (2007)
 "Get Hurt", a song by AFI from AFI (2017)